Stubley is a surname. Notable people with this surname include:

 Francis Horace Stubley (1833–1886), Australian politician
 Trevor Stubley (1932–2010), British painter and illustrator

See also
 Studley (surname)